was a samurai during the Tokugawa shogunate, and an interpreter of Dutch and English. He studied English under Dutch merchants and Ranald MacDonald. He was called upon to assist shogunate officials during the "Manhattan Incident" of 1845, during which the American whaling ship Manhattan approached Edo to repatriate 22 castaway Japanese seamen.  As Chief Dutch Interpreter, he was later one of the chief men involved in the negotiations with Commodore Perry in regard to the opening of Japan to the outside world.
 
Samuel Wells Williams, a member of Perry's second visit noted in 1854:

Notes

See also
Nakahama Manjirō

Samurai
1820 births
1872 deaths
Interpreters
19th-century translators
Members of the First Japanese Embassy to Europe